Dalia Kirilova Zafirova (Bulgarian: Далия Кирилова Зафирова, born 2 April 1991) is a Bulgarian former professional tennis player and member of the Bulgaria Fed Cup team. On 21 September 2009, she reached her highest WTA singles ranking of 499 whilst her best doubles ranking was 410 on 11 November 2013.

ITF Circuit finals

Singles: 5 (2 titles, 3 runner–ups)

Doubles 17 (8 titles, 9 runner–ups)

References

External links

 
 
 

1991 births
Living people
Bulgarian female tennis players